Jabez Melville Smith (born August 10, 1843 - ?) was a doctor and state representative in Mississippi. He was elected to represent Yalobusha County in the Mississippi House of Representatives in 1903. Smith married and had several children.

James Osborn Jeffreys Smith and Martha née Calloway Smith were his parents. Smith served in the Confederate Army and then graduated from Missouri Medical College in 1870. He was a Democrat, Methodist, and a member of the masons. He married Elizabeth Gibbs and had eight children.

References

1843 births
People from Yalobusha County, Mississippi
Democratic Party members of the Mississippi House of Representatives
Confederate States Army personnel
Date of death unknown
Year of death unknown
19th-century American physicians
20th-century American politicians
20th-century American physicians
Washington University School of Medicine alumni
American Freemasons
Methodists from Mississippi